Çayarxı (also, Chayarkhy) is a village and municipality in the Goychay Rayon of Azerbaijan.  It has a population of 1,574.

References 

Populated places in Goychay District